The 2009 EU Cup of Australian rules football was held in Samobor (Croatia) from 3 until 9 October 2009, with 15 national teams.

Venue 
Matches were played on the small stadium of NK Samobor (main and auxiliary ground).

Teams

Pools round

Group A

Group B

Group C

Group D

Semi finals

Ranking Matches

Grand final

Best on Ground: Will Worthington (England)

Final standings
1. England (EU Cup Winners)
2. The Netherlands (Silver)
3. Croatia (Bronze)
4. Spain
5. Scotland (Plate Winners) 
6. Ireland
7. Finland
8. Germany
9. Iceland (Bowl Winners) 
10. EU Crusaders 
11. Andorra
12. France 
13. Italy 
14. Austria 
15. Czech Republic

EU Cup Best & Fairest: Tomas Lundon (Ireland) & Josip Kravar (Croatia) – 16 votes

Leading Goalkicker: Marcus Crook (Scotland) – 12 goals

References

External links 
 Official site of the 2009 EU Cup

EU Cup
International sports competitions hosted by Croatia
EU Cup
2009 in European sport
2009 in Australian rules football